Anne Wizorek (born 5 May 1981) is a German journalist, author and feminist.

Life
In January 2013, she founded the blog Kleinerdrei.  She was the editor-in-chief of the blog with Juliane Leopold from 2013 to December 2018 when it became defunct. In 2013, she along with other feminists created the hashtag #Aufschrei. The hashtag won the Grimme Online Award. Wizorek wrote a book the following year titled Weil ein #Aufschrei nicht reicht.

Works
 Anne Wizorek, Weil ein #Aufschrei nicht reicht (Because an #outcry is not enough), 2014, 
 Anne Wizorek, Generation müsy: Der Rückzug ins Private ist gefährlich (Generation müsy: Retreating into Private life is dangerous), 2015, 
 Anne Wizorek and Hannah Lühmann, Gendern?! Gleichberechtigung in der Sprache - ein Für und ein Wider (Gender?! Equal Rights in Language - a Pros and Cons), 2018,

See also
 Feminism in Germany

References

1981 births
Living people
German feminists
People from Rüdersdorf
German women journalists
German women writers
German bloggers
German women bloggers
Writers from Brandenburg